Karen Washington is a political activist and community organizer fighting for food justice.

Biography 
Washington grew up in New York City, attended Hunter College and received her masters in occupational biomechanics and ergonomics from New York University in 1981. In 1985, she moved from Harlem to the Bronx with her two children. Washington studied organic gardening at the Center for Agroecology and Sustainable Food Systems at UC Santa Cruz in 2006.

In 1988, after years of tending a garden in her backyard, Karen Washington helped found the Garden of Happiness in the Bronx. A decade later this garden teamed up with other community gardens in New York City to launch a farmers market. In the late 1990s Mayor Giuliani attempted to sell many community garden properties at auctions. Using various tactics such as protests, civil disobedience, and diplomatic negotiations, Washington and other community activists succeeded in saving the plots for continued use as community gardens. Washington returned to New York after completing the training program at UC Santa Cruz and founded Farm School NYC and Black Urban Growers.

In 2014, Washington began an apprenticeship at Roxbury Farm in Kinderhook, New York. After her apprenticeship, she "retired" to co-found Rise and Root Farm in Chester, New York.

In 2018, rather than using the term "food desert," she coined the intersectional term "food apartheid" to bring attention to social inequalities and injustices in the entire food system.

Organizations

Farm School NYC
Farm School NYC provides agricultural training and educational opportunities for New York City residents. Through grassroots social justice and a community based approach this organization hopes to "inspire positive local action around food access and social, economic, and racial justice issues."

Black Urban Growers 
They first began in 2009 with community events focused around food. In 2010 Black Urban Growers put on the first annual Black Farmers and Urban Growers Conference with over 500 participants. Their mission is "to engage people of African descent in critical food and farm-related issues that directly impact our health, communities, and economic security."

Rise and Root Farm 
Co-founder of a sustainable farm in Orange County, New York that is cooperatively-run and women-led.

Recognition 
In 2012, she was named in Ebonys "Power 100" of influential African-Americans, and in 2014 she received the James Beard Foundation Leadership Award.

References 

Urban agriculture
Food activists
American community activists
African-American activists
American women farmers
Women horticulturists and gardeners
American gardeners
Hunter College alumni
New York University alumni
American physiotherapists
Activists from New York City
Living people
Year of birth missing (living people)
21st-century American women
21st-century African-American women
Urban farmers